Alfredo Chinchilla  (born 2 March 1962) is a Costa Rica born Norwegian judoka. He was born in San José, Costa Rica.

He competed at the 1984 Summer Olympics in Los Angeles.

Chinchilla won nine gold medals in Norwegian championships during his active career. He has later worked as coach.

References

1962 births
Living people
Norwegian male judoka
Judoka at the 1984 Summer Olympics
Olympic judoka of Norway
Costa Rican emigrants to Norway